As the Girls Go is a musical with music by Jimmy McHugh, lyrics by Harold Adamson and a book by William Roos.

After an out-of-town tryout at the Opera House in Boston in October 1948, the original Broadway production of As the Girls Go opened at the Winter Garden Theatre on November 13, 1948, transferred to The Broadway Theatre and ran for a total of 420 performances.  The production was directed by Howard Bay, choreographed by Hermes Pan and produced by Michael Todd. It starred Bobby Clark and Irene Rich and featured Hobart Cavanaugh, Betty Jane Watson (replaced by Fran Warren), June Kirby, Jo Sullivan, and Pauline Hahn. A teenaged Abbe Lane, billed as Abbe Marshall, was in the ensemble. The production's musical director, Max Meth won a Tony Award for his work.

Synopsis
In 1953 (four years ahead), a woman (Lucille Thompson Wellington) is elected President of the United States.  The First Husband (Waldo Wellington) gets around town quite a bit, presiding at events, receiving honorary degrees, and making a mess of protocol.  The first female president's foes try to cook up a scandal by throwing women into the path of the flirty First Spouse, but they have no luck.

Musical numbers
Act I
As the Girls Go - Waldo Wellington, Max Wellington and Girls
Nobody's Heart But Mine - Kathy Robinson and Kenny Wellington
Brighten Up and Be a Little Sunbeam - Waldo Wellington, Max Wellington and Children
Rock, Rock, Rock - Kenny Wellington, Max Wellington and Kathy Robinson
It's More Fun Than a Picnic - Mickey Wellington, Max Wellington and Children
American Cannes - Waldo Wellington and Girls
You Say the Nicest Things, Baby - Kathy Robinson, Kenny Wellington and Singing Girls
I've Got the President's Ear - Waldo Wellington and Girls
Holiday in the Country - Entire Company
       
Act II
There's No Getting Away from You - Kathy Robinson and Singing, Dancing Ensemble
Lucky in the Rain - Kenny Wellington, Kathy Robinson and Ensemble
Father's Day - Waldo, Lucille, Kenny, Mickey and Tommy Wellington
It Takes a Woman to Get a Man - Waldo Wellington and Ensemble
You Say the Nicest Things, Baby (Reprise) - Waldo Wellington and Lucille Thompson Wellington

External links

Time magazine review
Profile at MusicalHeaven.com
Prepping the girls for "As the Girls Go" from the Museum of the City of New York Collections blog

1948 musicals
Broadway musicals
Tony Award-winning musicals